George Lorenzo Ingram Zundel (Brigham City, Utah, December 23, 1885 – March 10, 1950) was an American mycologist, phycologist, and plant pathologist.

Biography 
He studied at Brigham Young University in 1909, and afterwards at the Agricultural College of Utah (now Utah State University), where in 1911, he received a degree. He taught botany at the university, and middle school biology in Brigham City. In 1913 he moved to New York and two years later received a M.Sc. from Cornell University. In 1926 he began studying at Yale University; where he defended a doctoral thesis, dedicated to Ustilaginomycetes. From 1928 to 1946, he worked at the University of Pennsylvania, and then retired for health reasons. Zundel died March 10, 1950, in Brigham City.

Some publications 

 1937. Raspberry Disease Control

Books 
 1939. (Ustilaginales): Additions and Corrections. North American Flora 7, splits 14. With John Hendley Barnhart. Ed. New York Botanical Garden, 75 pp.
 1938. The Ustilaginales of South Africa
 1938. To New Smut from Southern Chile
 1937. Miscellaneous Notice on the Ustilaginales

Honors

Eponymy 
 Genus
 Zundeliomyces Vánky, 1987
 Zundelula Thirum. & Naras., 1952 without. Dermatosorus Sawada, 1949

 Species
 Sorosporium zundelianum Cif., 1933 without. Sporisorium tembuti (Henn. & Pole-Evans) Vánky, 2007
 Sphacelotheca zundelii Hirschh., 1986, nom. inval.
 Sporisorium zundelianum Vánky, 1995
 Tilletiazundelii Hirschh., 1943

References 

Cornell University College of Agriculture and Life Sciences alumni
Yale University alumni
Utah State University alumni
Botanists with author abbreviations
1950 deaths
American mycologists
1885 births
University of Pennsylvania faculty